Viktor Vladimirovich Saltykov (born November 22, 1957, Leningrad) is a Soviet and Russian singer. He is known as a solo artist, as well as the singer with the bands , Forum and Electroclub.

Biography
In 1977–1979, while serving in the Soviet Army in the German Democratic Republic (Group of Soviet Forces in Germany), Saltykov played and sang in an army band.

After the army he enrolled into the Petersburg State Transport University, graduating in 1985 with a degree in electrical engineering.

In 1983, Viktor Saltykov with the rock band Manufaktura took part in the first Leningrad Rock Festival and won the Grand Prix of the festival as the best singer. He moved to the Forum group in 1984. It is with Forum that Viktor performed his most famous songs (White Night, Little Island, Uleteli listya). In 1987, Saltykov joined the Electroclub group.

Since 1990, as a solo artist, Saltykov released four studio albums; his old material has been re-released in numerous compilations.

Family 
 First wife singer Irina Saltykova (1966)
 Daughter Alisa (1987)
 Second wife Irina Metlina
 Daughter Anna (1995)
 Son Svyatoslav (2008)

References

External links
 
 
 Peoples.ru

1957 births
Living people
Singers from Saint Petersburg
Soviet male singers
Soviet pop singers
Russian rock singers
Russian pop singers
20th-century Russian male singers
20th-century Russian singers